Ius Laboris is a global alliance of law firms that specialise in employment, labour, immigration and pensions law. The network has over 1,500 HR lawyers based in 59 countries across Europe, the Americas, Middle East and Asia. Ius Laboris member firms advise HR professionals and legal counsel internationally on their HR legal requirements.

History 
Ius Laboris was established in 2001 by a group of labour and employment lawyers from Belgium, France, Spain, Luxembourg and Italy. In 2021, the alliance covers 59 countries across the Americas, Europe, the Middle East and Asia. The current Chairman is Pascal Lagoutte and the Executive Director is Sam Everatt.

Specialisation
Members of the network offer legal advice in their respective countries and on the following areas:

 Employment Rights 
 Restructuring and Labour Relations 
 Immigration and Global Mobility
 Pay and Benefits 
 Data Privacy 
 Discrimination  

 Health and Safety 
 Pensions

Members

Rankings and awards

 Band 1 - Employment: The Elite in Global-wide - Chambers and Partners (2020)
 Highly commended - Global Network of the Year - The Lawyer European Awards (2020)

References

External links
Ius Laboris official site
Global HR Law Guide official website

Law firms of Belgium
International organisations based in Belgium
International law organizations